Héctor González Baeza (born 16 March 1986 in Barakaldo, Spain) is a Spanish professional road racing cyclist.

Palmarès

2004
 2nd, National U19 Time Trial Championship
 3rd, National U19 Road Race Championship
2006
 1st, Stage 2, Bidasoa Itzulia
 1st, Stage 4, Bizkaiko Bira
2007
 3rd, National U23 Time Trial Championship

External links

Cyclists from the Basque Country (autonomous community)
Spanish male cyclists
1986 births
Living people
Sportspeople from Barakaldo